Al-Zahabi ( الذهبي) is an Arabic surname that means gold/golden. The Alzahabi family or The House of Gold (بيت الذهبي) as they are known in Syria, are the seventh richest family in Damascus, the capital of Syria. They are one of the seven oldest families that make up Damascus.

The family obtained their name from their trade as gold merchants and are known for their fair hair and pale complexion. The family still trades around the world from their shop located in the al-Hamidiyah Souq (Arabic: سوق الحميدية), the largest and the central souk in Syria, located inside the old walled city of Damascus next to the Citadel. The souq starts at Al-Thawra street and ends at the Umayyad Mosque plaza.

Syrian families
Arabic-language surnames
Surnames